The 2006 Valencian Community motorcycle Grand Prix was the last race of the 2006 Motorcycle Grand Prix season. It took place on the weekend of 27–29 October 2006 at the Valencia circuit. The MotoGP riders' championship was decided at this race, as Nicky Hayden's third place ensured he completed the season with more points than his rival, and polesitter for the race, Valentino Rossi, who finished down in thirteenth after he fell during the race.

The race was also notable for two lasts; the last race with the 990cc (60.4 cu in) engines which débuted in 2002, and the last race for the Honda RC211V, as the engines switched to 800cc (48.8 cu in) in capacity and Honda would field the RC212V from 2007.

MotoGP classification

250 cc classification

125 cc classification

Championship standings after the race (MotoGP)

Below are the standings for the top five riders and constructors after round sixteen has concluded.

Riders' Championship standings

Constructors' Championship standings

 Note: Only the top five positions are included for both sets of standings.

References

Valencian Community motorcycle Grand Prix
Valencian
Valencian Community Motorcycle Grand Prix
21st century in Valencia